is a Japanese manga written and illustrated by Taiyō Matsumoto. It is an anthology collection of short stories, all revolving around teenage boys at high school and the lives they live. A live action film adaptation was released in 2001. The manga was licensed for English-language release by Viz Media.

Release
Blue Spring is written and illustrated by Taiyō Matsumoto. Shogakukan released a tankōbon volume under the Big Spirits Comics imprint on May 1, 1993. Shogakukan re-released it in wide-ban volume on December 19, 1998. Shogakukan re-released it again in a bunkoban edition on January 14, 2012.

In North America, Blue Spring was published in English language by Viz Media on January 4, 2005.

Volume list

References

Further reading

External links

1993 manga
Drama anime and manga
Manga anthologies
Seinen manga
Shogakukan manga
Taiyō Matsumoto
Thriller anime and manga
Viz Media manga